The Independence Valley tui chub (Siphateles bicolor isolata) is a subspecies of tui chub endemic to the drainage of the Independence Valley in Elko County, northern Nevada.

Described as "abundant" when first collected and identified in 1965, it was considered extinct within less than a decade due to the introduction of sunfish, bass, and carp to the previously isolated watershed. However, it had been rediscovered by the year 2000, although it remains highly threatened.

References 

Chubs (fish)
Fish described in 1972
Fish of the Western United States
Freshwater fish of the United States
Fauna of the Southwestern United States
Endemic fauna of the United States
Elko County, Nevada
Natural history of Nevada
Siphateles